Paul Gertler (born March 30, 1955) is an American economist and the Li Ka Shing Distinguished Professor of Economics in the Haas School of Business and the School of Public Health at UC Berkeley.

Gertler is considered an early pioneer in the randomized evaluation of social programs in developing countries. He co-led the impact evaluation of the Mexican government welfare program Oportunidades, as well as the Rwandan government's roll-out of results-based financing for health. As Chief Economist for the World Bank Human Development Network (2004-2006), he helped to establish a culture of rigorous impact evaluation.

He is the author of the best selling textbook Impact Evaluation in Practice and the recently released second edition, published by The World Bank Press. He is a co-founder and Scientific Director of the Center for Effective Global Action at the University of California. He previously served as the Chairman of the Board of Commissioners for 3ie, the International Initiative for Impact Evaluation.

External links 
 Personal Website

References 

1955 births
21st-century American economists
Living people
University of Wisconsin–Madison alumni
Haas School of Business faculty
Center for Global Development
UC Berkeley School of Public Health faculty